Kevan Smith (born 13 December 1959, Eaglescliffe, Co. Durham) is a former English footballer. He participated in three of Darlington's promotions. Smith played over 400 games for Darlington in two separate seasons.

Career
Smith first appeared for his local team Darlington. Smith was on trial in a game against the club's professionals under Len Walker before playing in the reserves against Barnsley. In the summer of 1979, Walker left the Quakers but Smith was invited back by newly appointed Billy Elliott. Smith impressed Elliott in the reserves and was quickly snapped up.

Smith made his debut at Torquay United in September 1979 as the Quakers lost 4–0. Teammate Clive Nattress called him 'Smudger'. It was a nickname which stuck with him for the rest of his time at the club. Smith was a brave, hard-working and committed player.

However, it was under Elliott's successor Cyril Knowles, who said he could not believe Smudger was a footballer, that Smith really came into his own and by his own admission improved as a player. Knowles, who joined Darlington in 1983, demanded nothing less than 100% from his players and Smith filled the mould perfectly. The 1984/85 season saw Darlington promoted from the Fourth Division, but Smith left for Rotherham feeling the manager did not rate him highly enough.

Smith later moved to Coventry City for £65,000. Although he was in the Coventry squad when they won the FA Cup (although he did not play), he played only a handful of top flight games for the Sky Blues, partly due to injury. He moved to York City in 1988. Things failed to work out for Smith at Bootham Crescent, but by this stage both Darlington and rivals Hartlepool United were interested in securing his services.

Smith rejoined Darlington, who had recently been relegated to the Conference, after speaking to Brian Little. In under a year Smith had dropped from the top of English football to the bottom. But this second spell at Darlington would prove to be the best years of Smith's career.

Darlington won promotion from the Conference at the first attempt and the following season (1990/91) were promoted from the Fourth Division to the Third. Little left to join Leicester City and the bottom dropped out of Smith's world. The pair were very close  and Little was begged to stay by the player. Little recommended Smith for the management job at the club but instead Smudger convinced Frank Gray to take the job. Rumours persisted about Smith taking over as the Quakers struggled in the higher league. Smith tried to quash the rumours but was dropped by Gray.

Smith had felt he was too young for the job, but when Gray left the club in 1992 Smith applied for the job. However, Ray Hankin was given the position on a temporary measure. Smith had hoped to get the job and had an interview, though the Quakers installed Billy McEwan on a permanent basis. The pair's relationship was rocky at best. In the summer of 1992 Smith required a major operation and was told he would need ten weeks to recover but came back after nine. Upon coming back, McEwan said he wanted a new center back.

Matters remained difficult between the pair and later McEwan told Smith he was being released on a free transfer. By this stage though Smith was close to a testimonial and refused to leave. The relationship between the pair got worse and Smith was left further isolated and had to train on his own. Towards the end of his time at the club Smith did regain his place in the team. Between September 1997 and October 1998 Smith was joint Manager of Northern League club Crook Town working with former Darlington teammate Paul Cross.

The public and fanzine Mission Impossible backed the player. Smith returned to the Quakers to work for them as Football in the Community (FITC) Officer and went on to be Assistant Manager at Hull City with Little.

Honor's
Darlington
Fourth Division (now Football League Two) Winner: 1990–91
Football Conference  Winner: 1989–90
Fourth Division (now Football League Two) Promotion (third place): 1984–85

References

1959 births
Living people
People from Eaglescliffe
Footballers from County Durham
English footballers
Association football central defenders
Darlington F.C. players
Rotherham United F.C. players
Coventry City F.C. players
York City F.C. players
Hereford United F.C. players
Sliema Wanderers F.C. players
Whitby Town F.C. players
English Football League players
National League (English football) players
Sportspeople from Yorkshire